Tomas Mezera (born 5 November 1958 in Czechoslovakia) is a naturalised Australian racing driver. Mezera won the 1988 Bathurst 1000, and for many years was a member of the Holden Racing Team as both a driver and team manager. Mezera's sporting career began as a downhill skier in his native Czechoslovakia, before he emigrated to Australia to be a ski instructor. Mezera retired from racing in 2004 but continues to hold roles in motorsport, most recently as a driving standards advisor to several domestic motor racing championships.

Personal life
Born in 1958 in communist Czechoslovakia, Mezera was a skilled tennis player and skier in his youth - qualifying for and placing in national level ski events under the tutelage of his father, a ski coach in his own right. Mezera had an interest in motor racing at a young age and took part in amateur hillclimbs in the family Škoda. Mezera took up a Physics course at university after leaving school and joined their ski team, escaping to Hungary during an event and defecting to Austria via Belgrade. Having spent the second half of 1979 in a refugee camp outside Vienna, he arrived in Sydney prior to Christmas where he moved in with relatives. To make his start in racing, he worked as a garbage man, a panelbeater and a restaurant hand in Kings Cross.

Formula racing
Mezera quickly was introduced to racing and joined the ranks of Formula Ford in 1982. In November 1983 he was offered a drive for the 1984 FF season in a Reynard FF83, after being spotted by David Haydon of Dalcar Industries. Mezera finished 5th in the 1984 Formula Ford Driver to Europe Series, and won the 1985 Motorcraft Formula Ford Driver to Europe Series driving the Dalcar Reynard FF83 prepared by motorsport enthusiast and team owner David Haydon (with engines supplied by the Frank Gardner run JPS Team BMW). In 1987 he returned to Europe and the British Formula Ford Championship, finishing second. He had two poor years in British Formula 3 compromised by lack of budget. He found work as driving instructor to stay in Europe with hopes of reaching his goal as a professional in Europe.

Touring / Sports Cars
During 1988 while working as a driving instructor in England, Mezera was able to secure much needed parts for the Ford Sierra RS500 Group A touring car team run by Frank Gardner and Tony Longhurst. As it was Gardner's protest at Bathurst in 1987 that had led to the disqualification of Ford Europe supported Eggenberger Motorsport Sierras and caused them to lose the 1987 World Touring Car Championship to BMW, Ford did not want to supply parts to Tony Longhurst Racing team manager Gardner, and Mezera was asked to buy the needed parts for the team. As a reward Mezera was given the job of Longhurst's co-driver for the Sandown 500 and Bathurst 1000 races.

The pair won the 1988 Tooheys 1000 in their Benson & Hedges backed Ford Sierra RS500, with Mezera driving the car across the finish line. He then returned to Europe to continue his pursuit of racing professionally overseas, returning to Australia for the endurance season, racing for Perkins Engineering from 1989 until 1991. He finished third with Larry Perkins in the 1990 Bathurst 1000, and the pair won the 1990 Nissan Sydney 500 at Eastern Creek Raceway.

This led to racing a Porsche 962 for fellow Aussie Vern Schuppan in the All Japan Sports Prototype Championship and a drive in the 24 Hours of Le Mans in 1990 finishing 15th with co-drivers Eje Elgh and Thomas Danielsson. He had five races in the British Touring car Championship in 1989 and 1990 with two podium finishes.

When Win Percy returned to England after the 1991 season, Mezera was hired to drive for the Holden Racing Team. He was briefly assumed the role of team manager in 1993 after the departure of Neal Lowe until Jeff Grech was recruited.

Mezera was the first pole sitter when the ATCC became V8 Supercars in 1993 at Sydney's tight Amaroo Park circuit. He continued to race for HRT as teammate to Peter Brock until the end of the 1995 season before being replaced by Craig Lowndes. He was briefly part of John Trimbole's Daily Planet Racing before starting his own team in 1998 with the help of Derek van Zelm and on limited budget ran in the V8 Supercars Championship from 1998 until 2001. His full-time racing career wound down at that point although he continued to get drives as a hired gun for many teams.

In 2001 he made a return to the Holden Racing Team as an endurance driver and finished third in the 2002 Bathurst 1000 and fourth at the 2002 Queensland 500.

He retired from racing in 2004 and later served as a Driving Standards Official for Confederation of Australian Motor Sport and V8 Supercars Australia.

Career results

Complete Asia-Pacific Touring Car Championship results
(key) (Races in bold indicate pole position) (Races in italics indicate fastest lap)

Complete British Touring Car Championship results
(key) 

‡ Endurance driver.

† Not eligible for points due to being an endurance driver.

Complete Bathurst 1000 results

Complete 24 Hours of Le Mans results

References 

 Driver Database Stats
 Conrod V8 Supercar stats

Australian racing drivers
Czech racing drivers
Supercars Championship drivers
1958 births
Living people
Bathurst 1000 winners
British Touring Car Championship drivers
Formula Ford drivers
Australian Touring Car Championship drivers
People from Queensland
Australian people of Czech descent
Czechoslovak emigrants to Australia
Australian Endurance Championship drivers
British Formula Three Championship drivers